The 1987–88 DePaul Blue Demons men's basketball team represented DePaul University during the 1987–88 NCAA Division I men's basketball season. They were led by head coach Joey Meyer, in his 4th season at the school, and played their home games at the Rosemont Horizon in Rosemont.

DePaul went 21–7 in the regular season and received a bid to the 1988 NCAA Tournament as the No. 5 seed in the Midwest region. DePaul beat Wichita State in the opening round and were beaten by Kansas State, 66–58, and finished the season 22–8.

Roster

Schedule and results

|-
!colspan=9 style=| Regular Season

|-
!colspan=9 style= | NCAA tournament

Source:

Rankings

Team players drafted into the NBA

References 

DePaul Blue Demons men's basketball seasons
DePaul
1987 in sports in Illinois
1988 in sports in Illinois
DePaul